is a railway station in Kitami, Hokkaidō Prefecture, Japan. Its station number is A58.

Lines
Hokkaido Railway Company
Sekihoku Main Line

Adjacent stations

Railway stations in Hokkaido Prefecture
Railway stations in Japan opened in 1912

References